Luis Gómez (born August 19, 1951) is a Mexican former professional baseball player who played during the 1970s and 1980s. Born in Guadalajara, Jalisco, Mexico in 1951 and raised in the Echo Park neighborhood of Los Angeles, he attended and graduated from Nightingale Jr. High, then attended Belmont High School in Los Angeles, California and UCLA.

In 1969 Luis set two records in baseball and football at Belmont High with a .559 batting average and with 2,148 total yards as a quarterback. The 5'9" Gómez played on the UCLA baseball team for three years ('71-'73) at shortstop. There he compiled a batting average of .272, 2 HR, including a grand slam, and 34 RBI. During his senior year, his batting average was .301 in 52 games and 186 at bats.

Luis started his major league baseball career with the Minnesota Twins in 1974, playing with them until 1977. Then in 1978 he signed as a free agent with the Toronto Blue Jays where he set a single season team record of 19 sacrifice bunts ( still stands ). In 1980 he was traded to the Atlanta Braves, playing his two remaining seasons there and retiring in 1982. Luis set an Atlanta record in 1980 with a .968 fielding percentage at shortstop and strung together 42 consecutive errorless games. He played  shortstop, second base, and third base in 609 major league games.

External links

1951 births
Living people
Atlanta Braves players
Baseball players from Jalisco
Converts to Mormonism
Major League Baseball second basemen
Major League Baseball third basemen
Major League Baseball shortstops
Major League Baseball players from Mexico
Mexican expatriate baseball players in Canada
Mexican emigrants to the United States
Mexican Latter Day Saints
Minnesota Twins players
People from Echo Park, Los Angeles
Sportspeople from Guadalajara, Jalisco
St. Petersburg Pelicans players
Toronto Blue Jays players
UCLA Bruins baseball players
Orlando Twins players
Tacoma Twins players
Belmont High School (Los Angeles) alumni